Jetline is a roller coaster at Gröna Lund in Stockholm, Sweden. It has gained worldwide recognition for its curved lift hill, an anomaly amongst roller coasters. It was opened in 1988 and was a clone of the Knightmare roller coaster at Camelot Theme Park however It was modified in 1997 by Mauer Söhne to have a longer and steeper drop. Knightmare also pulled 5Gs while Jetline only pulls 4.5. A tunnel was also added at the bottom of the first drop.

Ride experience 
The ride starts with a curved lift hill that carries the ride vehicle to a height of 32 meters. A right turn leads in to the first drop. The drop leads in to a short tunnel and a turn back towards the station and the rest of the ride. The ride vehicle enters a short brake section which leads into the second drop. The maximum g-force of 4.5 is achieved at the bottom of the second drop. The second part of the ride is composed by banked turns and helices. The last helix leads into a tunnel and the station. The total duration for the roller coaster is approximately one minute and thirty seconds.

Reception

References 

Roller coasters in Sweden
Roller coasters introduced in 1988
Gröna Lund